Henry Clapp Sherman (October 16, 1875 – October 7, 1955) was an American food chemist and nutritionist. He was professor of chemistry at Columbia University and a president of the American Society of Biological Chemists.

Biography

Sherman was born in Ash Grove, Virginia. He received a Bachelor of Science degree from the Maryland Agricultural College in 1893, a Master of Science degree from Columbia University in 1896 and a Doctor of Philosophy degree in 1897. From 1899 until his retirement he was a faculty member in the Department of Chemistry at Columbia University and Professor of Food Chemistry. He was Executive Officer of the Department of Chemistry (1919-1939) and was awarded an honorary degree of Doctor of Science in 1929.

He provided early evidence that enzymes such as amylase could consist of pure protein and pioneered quantitive studies on the physiological impact of vitamin A, B1, B2, C calcium, phosphorus, iron and protein.

Personal life
He married Cora Aldrich Bowen on September 9, 1903. They had four children: Phoebe (deceased, 1929), Henry Alvord (chemical engineer), William Bowen (medicine, deceased,
1971), and Caroline Clapp (biochemist, Mrs. Oscar E. Lanford, Jr.).

Honors and awards
 1926 President, American Society of Biological Chemists
 1933 National Academy of Sciences, elected member
 1934 William H. Nichols Medal
 1947 Franklin Medal
 1949 Chandler Medal, Columbia University
 1950 Borden Award, American Institute of Nutrition

Selected publications

Chemistry of Food and Nutrition (1911)
Food Products (1914, 1948)
Methods of Organic Analysis (1915)
The Chemistry of Food and Nutrition (1918)
The Science of Nutrition (1943)
Foods: Their Values and Management (1946)
Food and Health (1947)
Calcium and Phosphorus in Foods and Nutrition (1947)
The Nutritional Improvement of Life (1950)
Essentials of Nutrition (1951)

References

1875 births
1955 deaths
20th-century American chemists
American food chemists
American food writers
American nutritionists
Columbia University alumni
Columbia University faculty
Dietitians
Vitamin researchers